Muaythai competition at the 2016 Asian Beach Games was held in Da Nang, Vietnam from 21 to 26 September 2016.

Medalists

Men

Women

Medal table

Results

Men

48 kg

51 kg

54 kg

57 kg

60 kg

63.5 kg

67 kg

71 kg

75 kg

81 kg

Women

48 kg

51 kg

54 kg

57 kg

60 kg

63.5 kg

References

External links 
 

2016 Asian Beach Games events
2016